Georges Montillier (1939 – 22 February 2022) was a French actor.

Life and career
Montillier was born in Roanne in 1939. A former student of the Conservatoire de Paris, he was also a resident of the Comédie-Française. In 1998, he left Paris and founded the Cours d'art Dramatique Myriade in Lyon, which he directed until 2009. Montillier died on 22 February 2022.

Filmography

Cinema
CIA contro KGB (1978)
 (1980)
 (1983)
My New Partner (1984)
 (1984)
My Brother-in-Law Killed My Sister (1986)
Pirates (1986)
Family Business (1986)
 (1986)
 (1987)
My New Partner II (1990)

Television
 (1969)
 (1971)
The New Adventures of Vidocq (1973)
Catherine (1986)
 (1987)
Navarro (1995)
 (1995)
 (1995)

Telefilms
 (1996)

References

1939 births
2022 deaths
20th-century French male actors
21st-century French male actors
French male film actors
French male television actors
French male stage actors
Conservatoire de Paris alumni
People from Roanne